The Sun Still Rises (Italian: Il sole sorge ancora) also known as Outcry is a 1946 Italian neorealist war-drama film directed by Aldo Vergano and starring Elli Parvo, Massimo Serato and Lea Padovani.

It was one of two films produced by the ANPI movement along with Giuseppe De Santis's Tragic Hunt (1947).

The film entered the competition at the 7th Venice International Film Festival.  For his performance Massimo Serato won the Nastro d'Argento for Best Supporting Actor. The film also won a special Nastro d'Argento for outstanding formal merits.

Synopsis
Following the Armistice of 1943, Cesare and his comrades leave the army and return to their homes. For Cesare this is a village in the Lombardy countryside outside Milan. There he becomes involved with Laura, a seamstress, but is also attracted to Mathilde an aristocrat. He is drawn back into the war when both the Italian Resistance and the German Army move into the area. After they shoot the local priest, the inhabitants rise up against the Germans and drive them out with the assistance of the partisans.

Cast 
 Elli Parvo as Matilde
 Lea Padovani as Laura
 Vittorio Duse as Cesare  
 Massimo Serato as Major Heinrich 
 Gillo Pontecorvo as Pietro 
 Checco Rissone as Mario
 Carlo Lizzani as Don Camillo
 Ada Cristina Almirante as Countess 
 Egisto Olivieri as Laura's Father
 Giuseppe De Santis as Count's attendant 
 Alfonso Gatto as Train conductor
 Mirko Ellis as Nazi officer
 Checco Durante
 Guido Aristarco

References

Bibliography
 Gundle, Stephen. Fame Amid the Ruins: Italian Film Stardom in the Age of Neorealism. Berghahn Books, 2019.

External links

1946 films
Italian war drama films
Films directed by Aldo Vergano
Italian neorealist films
1940s war drama films
Films about Italian resistance movement
Italian Campaign of World War II films
Italian black-and-white films
1946 drama films
Films set in 1943
Italian World War II films
1940s Italian films